Sawbones is a 1995 American film which was part of the Roger Corman Presents series.

Plot
An edgy, terrifying tale about an intern who failed medical school... but never gave up surgery.

Cast
Adam Baldwin as Detective Burt Miller
Nina Siemaszko as Jenny Sloan
Barbara Carrera as Rita Baldwin
Don Stroud as Captain Mowbray
Don Harvey as Willy Knapp
Nicholas Sadler as Brad Fraser

References

External links

Sawbones at TCMDB
Sawbones at Letterbox DVD

1995 films
Films produced by Roger Corman
1995 television films
1995 horror films
American horror television films
1990s English-language films
Films directed by Catherine Cyran
1990s American films